Daniel John Ivascyn is group chief investment officer for PIMCO.

Ivascyn holds a bachelor's degree in economics from Occidental College and an MBA from the University of Chicago Graduate School of Business.

References

External links
Sustaining income in challenging markets -- PIMCO's Daniel J. Ivascyn.

Living people
Year of birth missing (living people)
Chief investment officers
Occidental College alumni
University of Chicago Booth School of Business alumni
PIMCO